John Mulkey may refer to:

 John Mulkey (drag racer), American drag racer
 John H. Mulkey (1824–1905), American attorney and judge from Kentucky